Peter Pan is a 1976 American made-for-television musical film adaptation of J.M. Barrie's 1904 play and 1911 novel Peter Pan, or the Boy Who Wouldn't Grow Up starring Mia Farrow as Peter Pan and Danny Kaye as Captain Hook, and with Sir John Gielgud narrating.  Julie Andrews sang one of the songs, "Once Upon a Bedtime", off-camera over the opening credits. It aired as a presentation of Hallmark Hall of Fame on NBC at 7:30pm on Sunday, December 12, 1976, capping off the program's 25th year on the air.

The program did not use the score written for the highly successful Mary Martin version which had previously been televised many times on NBC. Instead, it featured 14 new and now forgotten songs, written for the production by Anthony Newley and Leslie Bricusse.  The story was adapted by Andrew Birkin (who would subsequently become a leading Barrie scholar) and Jack Burns.  Although it was an American production with two American stars, most of the cast was British and it was shot at the Elstree Studios of ATV Network outside London in the UK.

This version of Peter Pan won an Emmy for Outstanding Individual Achievement in Children's Programming for Jenn de Joux's and Elizabeth Savel's visual effects, and was nominated for Outstanding Children's Special, however it was not rebroadcast. But it was featured in 2011 at the Paley Center in New York City as part of the New York Musical Theatre Festival.

Cast 

Mia Farrow	... 	Peter Pan
Danny Kaye	... 	Captain Hook and Mr. Darling
(alphabetically)
Lynsey Baxter	... 	Jane
Peppi Borza	...  Pirate
Michael Crane	... 	Pirate
Michael Deeks	... 	Curly
Fred Evans	... 	Pirate
Jill Gascoine	... 	Grown up Wendy
John Gielgud	... 	Narrator
George Harris	... 	Pirate
Paula Kelly	... 	Tiger Lily
Max Latimer	... 	Pirate
Nicholas Lyndhurst	... 	Tootles
Virginia McKenna	... 	Mrs. Darling
Briony McRoberts	... 	Wendy Darling
Joe Melia	... 	Starkey
Peter O'Farrell	... 	Nana
Adam Richens	... 	Nibs
Ian Sharrock	... 	John Darling
Adam Stafford	... 	Michael Darling
Tony Sympson	... 	Smee
Jerome Watts	... 	Slightly

Production notes 

In 1976, this was the second of two TV musical adaptations of a children's classic which starred Danny Kaye opposite a woman playing the part of a young boy. On March 27, 1976, CBS telecast Pinocchio with Kaye as Gepetto and Sandy Duncan in the title role.

References

External links 
 

1976 television films
1970s fantasy adventure films
1976 films
1970s children's fantasy films
American fantasy adventure films
Films based on multiple works
American films based on plays
Films set in the 1900s
Hallmark Hall of Fame episodes
Musical television films
Musical television specials
Musicals based on novels
Peter Pan films
Television shows based on fairy tales
Television shows directed by Dwight Hemion
Television articles with incorrect naming style
1970s American films